"The Business" is the second official single (third overall) released from Yung Berg's debut album, Look What You Made Me. The track is produced by Rob Holladay and Yung Berg himself and features label mate Casha. It was released May 13, 2008. The single was certified gold by the RIAA on November 11, 2008, for sales of 500,000 copies.

Remix
The official remix features K-Young, Pleasure P, Twista, Cap 1, Maino and Jim Jones. Another remix features Raheem DeVaughn. The video shows Yung Berg with his "business woman", giving her "business" morning and night.

Charts

Weekly charts

Year-end charts

Certifications

References

2008 singles
Hitmaka songs
2008 songs
Sony BMG singles
Songs written by Hitmaka
MNRK Music Group singles
Music videos directed by Dale Resteghini